On Thursday, 19 January 2006, an audio tape was released, presumably of Osama bin Laden, warning that al-Qaeda was planning more attacks against the United States. The release of the tape came shortly after the United States' Central Intelligence Agency's Damadola airstrike in Pakistan, an attack that reportedly led to the deaths of Midhat Mursi, a veteran bomb and chemical expert and the head of an al-Qaeda training camp on the Afghanistan-Pakistan border, Khalid Habib, the al-Qaeda operations chief for Pakistan and Afghanistan, Abdul Rehman al Magrabi, a senior al-Qaeda operations commander, and 15 other people. Civilians were among the others killed, according to the Pakistani provincial government.

On the tape (which may have been recorded a month earlier), bin Laden boasted that "our situation is getting better, while your situation is getting worse." It also threatened future attacks on the United States, and simultaneously offered a "long truce", while not saying what the truce would involve. The White House immediately rejected the truce offer.

See also
 Videos and audio recordings of Osama bin Laden
 Fatāwā of Osama bin Laden
 October surprise

References

External links
 Damadola airstrike
 Transcript of the speech
 Osama "plug" boosts anti-US book
  Pakistan confirms militant deaths

Bin Laden tape
Videos of Osama bin Laden